The year 1512 in science and technology included a number of events, some of which are listed here.

Astronomy
 Possible date – Nicolaus Copernicus begins to write Commentariolus, an abstract of what will eventually become De revolutionibus orbium coelestium; he sends it to other scientists interested in the matter by 1514.

Exploration
 António de Abreu discovers Timor island and reaches the Banda Islands and Seram.
 Francisco Serrão reaches the Moluccas.
 Juan Ponce de León discovers the Turks and Caicos Islands.
 Pedro Mascarenhas discovers Diego Garcia and reaches Mauritius in the Mascarene Islands.

Pharmaceutics
 Hieronymus Brunschwygk's Big Book (of Distillation) describes medicinal herbs and the construction of stills for processing them.

Technology
 Martin Waldseemüller (of the Rhineland) produces and describes the first theodolite (which he calls the ).

Births
 March 5 – Gerardus Mercator, Flemish cartographer (died 1594)
 approx. date – Robert Recorde, Welsh-born mathematician and physician (died 1558)

Deaths
 February 22 – Amerigo Vespucci, Italian explorer (born 1454)
 August 2 – Alessandro Achillini, Italian anatomist (born 1463)
 September 29 – Johannes Engel, German astronomer and physician (born 1453)

References

 
16th century in science
1510s in science